Gondola is the general term for the usually-armored ventral casemate-style positions used on many World War II-era military bomber aircraft, especially on German designs, where they were usually known as Bodenlafette, often shortened to Bola (from German Boden, 'floor', + Lafette 'gun carriage or mounting', from French l'affût, gun carriage).

Gondolas were either used to house a gunner or a bombardier.

Gallery 
Examples of gondolas on World War II military aircraft:

See also 
Other types of aircraft equipped with gondolas:
 Airship
 Balloon (aircraft)

References 

Aircraft weapons